Naic, officially the Municipality of Naic,  is a 1st class municipality in the province of Cavite, Philippines. According to the 2020 census, it has a population of 160,987 people. Naic has a land area of 76.24 square kilometers.

Etymology
Naic, Cavite is one of the former barrios of Maragondon, along with 1) Magallanes (named after the Portuguese explorer Ferdinand Magellan); 2) Bailen (named after a town in Spain wherefrom the Friar Baltazar Narváez came, but renamed and now, General Emilio Aguinaldo, after the first President of the First Philippine Republic; 3) Tagaytay City, a former part of Alfonso; 4) Alfonso, (named after the King Alfonso who ascended the throne as a youngster, after his mother, a child Queen abdicated—after being enthroned by a General -later Count- Narváez); and 5) Ternate (a town with three names, Ternate, Wawa, Barra. Ternate was the name of the home in Mollucas of the settlers who were sent by the Dutch and Portuguese to the Philippines to fight the Chinese Pirates; Wawa was the name for this Shores-rich little site; Barra was the name given for this "Docking Place or Site" of Maragondon.)

Better spelled NAIC as an acronym-for Nuestra Adorada (or Amable or Amante) Inmaculada Concepción, Spanish for Our Adorable (or Amiable or Loving) Immaculate Conception, referring to the Patroness of the then barrio, Our Lady of the Immaculate Conception, whose feast the barrio celebrated (and the town continues to celebrate) on December 8.

Naic has several histories when it comes to the origin of its name. One theory suggests that it originated when a Spaniard asked a native about what the pig is doing and he said "na-igik" (crying sound of pigs), thus later on developed as Naic. Another one suggests that it came from a Spanish word "Ca - Naic" meaning "neighboring place" by which its mother town was the present Maragondon. Another theory put forward is that Naic is an acronym for Nuestra Adorada Immaculada Concepcion.  The town's name is the Spanish translation of the town's patron saint, Our Lady of Immaculate Concepcion. As an honor and reverence to Our Lady of Immaculate Conception, the town folks celebrate annually their town fiesta on every 8th day of December.

History 
Thousands of years ago, Naic was a part of the towering Taal Volcano. Naic was the western slope of the volcano until its internal eruption which led to the sinking of its apex in its present condition.

When the Jesuits discovered Maragondon in 1627, its total land area covers the whole of Naic, Ternate, and Magallanes (Vance; Saulo and De Ocampo, 1990; Medina, 1992). In 1758, the Jesuits founded a community in the western bank of the river (present Barangay Muzon) and made it into a "sitio" with a visita still under Maragondon.

In 1791, the community was finally made into a town with its population still in the western bank. The town was named Naic after the old archaic word "can(ia)ayic" meaning "town near one another" or "the other side" (Medina, 1992), while Alfredo B. Saulo contends that Naic is a highly cultured Tagalog word meaning "suburbs" or "countryside". Also in Malaysia, Naic means "overboard".

Moreover, due to the closeness of Naic to the population in Maragondon, Naic transferred its center in 1798 to the eastern bank of the river (the present poblacion)(Medina, 1992). Also during this time, the town was already a flourishing fishing and agricultural village (Villanueva, 1982). On the other hand, the church, since 1797, was under the secular clergy who were mostly Filipinos (Jose, 1997; Medina, 1992). Upon the "Royal Audiencia" issued in 1849, the church was transferred to the Dominican Friars in 1865. The Dominicans upon finding out that the land in Naic was fertile, built the Casa Hacienda de Naic (the present Naic Elementary School) to be the administration building for the overseer of the larger friar lands in Naic (Jose, 1996).

In the Philippine Revolution of 1896–1898, all of the names of the towns in Cavite were Filipinized, thus, the name of Naic was changed to Naik, but was also commonly known as "Maguagi". Furthermore, five events significant to the revolution took place in Naic. These were as follows:

1. The designing of the first official flag of the country which took place in Sulok, Naic, Cavite (the present Velamart).

2. The creation of the Naic Military Agreement, a document by which Andres Bonifacio sought to assert his authority as leader of the Philippine revolutionary government in defiance of Emilio Aguinaldo's government initiated in Tejeros (Casa Hacienda de Naic).

3. The appointment of the first cabinet ministers including the Departments of Interior, Justice, Finance, and Defence (Casa Hacienda de Naic).

4. The Battle of Timalan where the Filipino revolutionists won overwhelmingly against the Spanish troops in May 1897 (Timalan, Naic Cavite).

5. The Battle of Naic where Aguinaldo declared the town to be his last defense (Poblation) (Medina, 1996, de Achutegui, 1972; Aguinaldo, 1964; T.A. Agoncillo, 1963).

6. The Founding of The Taparan Guerilla Unit in February 1942 by Lt. Col. Emilio Arenas, Tomas Arenas, and Jose Arenas-Paman, which delayed the invasion of Japanese Imperial forces and gave way to the safe flight of Naik's residents to Maragonon.

The prominent people who paved the way for the revolution in Naic included former gobernadorcillos and capitanes municipal; namely, Cirilo Arenas, Gregorio (Goyo) Jocson, in whose house General Aguinaldo recuperated from illness, Benito Poblete, and Tobal Bustamante.

A sprinkling of upperclassmen could also be found in other towns of Cavite whose wealth came from rural landholdings, urban properties, and/or successful business ventures. The Cuencas of Bacoor, the Papa, De Castro, Valentin, and Arenas families of Naic, the Darwins of Indang, who were/are Spanish nobilities and margraves with ranks of Duques, Marquis, Condes and Vizcondes, pertained to this class.

Naic is also the very first town in the country to pass an ordinance banning pigs from the street. It had been a perennial problem of the country. It is one of the greatest achievement of Naic because the other towns followed suit.

Geography 
The municipality of Naic is located on the western part of the province along the shorelines of Manila Bay. Trece Martires City and Tanza bound it to the east. Situated beyond the southern portion of Naic is Indang and the western boundary is shared with Ternate and Maragondon. Travel between Naic and Metro Manila covers 47 Kilometers. Majority of the upland towns and some of those in lowlands trade with Naic due to its strategic geographical position. The coordinates of Naic are 14°32 latitude and 120°768 longitude.

Barangays 
The Municipality of Naic is politically subdivided into 30 barangays.

Climate

Demographics

It is the 9th most populous and the 14th most densely populated municipality/city in the province. The massive increase can be observed in the year 1990 when industrialization was introduced in the Province of Cavite (including Naic). Investors established their businesses in different industrial estates that magnetized people to migrate to Cavite due to job opportunities the province offers. Another factor attributed to the increase of population is the mushrooming of housing subdivisions (such as Belmont Homes in Palangue and Dorothea Homes in both Halang and Calubcob). Natural increase also contributes to the increase in population. The population density of the municipality based on the 2015 census was 1,500 inhabitants per square kilometre or 3,800 inhabitants per square mile.

Among the barangays in Naic, Barangay Ibayo Silangan has the biggest population with 11,250 people while Barangay Balsahan has registered the smallest population with 478 people.

The population of Naic have grown from the past few years. In 1990 the recorded population count by the Philippine Statistics Authority is about 52,000, about 73,000 in year 2000 (which increased by 3.45%), 87,058 is recorded in 2007 (2.46% increase), about 88,000 in 2010 (0.39% increase) and 111,454 in 2015 (increased by 4.60%).

Languages 
The vernacular language is Filipino, based mostly on the Tagalog of surrounding areas, and this Tagalog form used is the Manila form of spoken Tagalog which essentially become the lingua franca of the Philippines, having spread throughout the archipelago through mass media and entertainment. English is the language most widely used in education and business.

Religion
The Catholic population of Naic is primarily served by the Diocesan Shrine of the Immaculate Conception Church. And there has been fast growth of other Protestant denominations including Iglesia ni Cristo. Aglipayan Church is the third majority denomination in town.

Economy

Government

Elected officials
The following are the elected officials of the town elected last May 09, 2022 which serves until 2025:

Education 
Education in the Philippines is managed and regulated by the Department of Education (DepEd), Commission on Higher Education (CHED) and Technical Education and Skills Development Authority (TESDA). DepEd is responsible for the K–12 basic education; it exercises full and exclusive control over public schools and nominal regulation overprivate schools, and it also enforces the national curriculum that has been put in place since 2013. CHED and TESDA, on the other hand, are responsible for higher education; CHED regulates the academically-oriented universities and colleges while TESDA oversees the development of technical and vocational education institutions and programs in the country.

Public schools 
High Schools
 Naic Coastal National High School
 Naic Integrated National High School
 Ciudad Nuevo de Naic National High School (CNDNNHS)
 Pueblo del Mar National High School
 Centro de Naic National High School 
 Cavite State University (CvSU) Laboratory Science High School

Private schools 
High-Schools

 Cavite Community Academy
 Colegio de Naic
 Immaculate Concepcion School
 King's Way Christian Academe
 La Vlaize Integrated Science School
 The Valley Cathedral Academy
 Western Colleges
 Far East Asia Pacific Institute of Tourism Science and Technology
 Abeniano Delos Santos Academy Inc.

See also
Casa Hacienda de Naic
Naic Military Agreement

References

External links

[ Philippine Standard Geographic Code]
Philippine Census Information
Municipality of Naic - Cavite.gov.ph

Municipalities of Cavite
Populated places on Manila Bay